Garstang Community Academy (formerly Garstang High School) is a secondary school with academy status in the parish of Barnacre-with-Bonds near Garstang in Lancashire, England. It is a coed institution serving children aged 11 to 16. It is non denominational, and non boarding. It opened on 21 October 1958.

References

External links
Official site
BBC School Table
Directgov School Profile
Ofsted Inspection Reports

Academies in Lancashire
Schools in the Borough of Wyre
Secondary schools in Lancashire
Educational institutions established in 1958
1958 establishments in England